The Chemnitz Reichstag constituency was constituency No. 16 in the Kingdom of Saxony which returned a deputy to the German Reichstag. It was based upon what was the town of Chemnitz.

Following the North German Confederation Treaty the Kingdom of Saxony entered the North German Confederation in 1866. As a consequence, the Kingdom returned Deputies to the Reichstag of the North German Confederation. After the founding of the German Empire on 18 January 1871, the deputies were returned to the Reichstag of the German Empire. Following this Saxony participated in Reichstag elections from February 1867. Glauchau-Meerane returned a series of Reichstag Deputies until 1919 when the existing constituencies were scrapped.

The deputies elected for the Glauchau-Meerane Reichstag constituency were as follows:

References

Reichstag constituencies in the Kingdom of Saxony